Faqiri (adjective form of Fakir or Faqir, a Sufi Muslim ascetic) is a Dari surname. Faghiri is the romanization of its Persian equivalent. Notable people with the surname include:
 Mohammad Nasim Faqiri (born 1958), Afghan politician and diplomat
 Mohammad Nazar Faqiri (born 1955), Afghan politician

References 

Dari-language surnames